Playtime is a 1961 studio album by Buddy Rich.

Track listing
LP side A
"Lulu's Back in Town" (Al Dubin, Harry Warren) – 5:53
"Playtime" (Sam Most) – 6:14
"Will You Still Be Mine?" (Tom Adair, Matt Dennis) – 4:45
"Fascinating Rhythm" (George Gershwin, Ira Gershwin) – 4:39
LP side B
"Makin' Whoopee" (Walter Donaldson, Gus Kahn) – 4:26
"Marbles" (Johnny Morris, Most) – 5:51
"Misty" (Johnny Burke, Erroll Garner) – 5:10
"Cheek to Cheek" (Irving Berlin) – 6:15

Personnel
Buddy Rich - drums
Sam Most - flute
Don Goldie - trumpet
Wilbur Wynne - guitar
Johnny Morris - piano
Mike Mainieri - vibraphone

References

Argo LP 676

1962 albums
Buddy Rich albums
Argo Records albums